This article is the list of international matches of the South Korea national under-23 football team from 2020 to present.

Results by year

Under-23 matches

2020

Source:

2021

Source:

2022

Source:

See also
 South Korea national under-23 football team results

References

External links
 Men's U-23 Squads & Results at KFA

2020